Princeton, is a city in and the county seat of Mercer County, West Virginia, United States. The city is coined the "Heart of Mercer County" or the "Jewel of the South" in past decades. The population was 6,432 at the 2010 census with approximately 35,000 residents living in the greater Princeton area. It is part of the Bluefield, WV-VA micropolitan area which has a population of 107,342. The city hosts the Princeton WhistlePigs baseball club of the Appalachian League. A main tourist destination of the city is the Mercer Street Grassroots District located in Downtown Princeton. This area has been revitalized and is now home to cafes, restaurants, shops, and artistic venues.

History

Princeton and the Civil War 
Although Princeton did not see any major battles on its soil, there was the Battle of Pigeon Roost, or the Battle of Princeton Courthouse on May 17, 1862, a victory for the Confederates defending the Dublin railroad.   

Princeton had been burned a couple of weeks earlier on May 1 under the command of Captain Walter Jenifer, CSA to prevent the Union army from acquiring their supplies.  The town was not burned in retaliation or anger toward the residents of Princeton.  In fact, according to local history, many of the residents of Princeton torched their own homes and moved on from the area.  Few structures would remain after the fire.  The Robert McNutt house is the only structure that remains in Princeton which, ironically, served as headquarters for the Union army at one time.  Princeton and Mercer County would remain supportive of the Confederacy, and was not included in the original counties that made up the new state of West Virginia.

By the end of 1865 Judge Nathaniel Harrison was appointed as circuit judge, and Princeton residents shunned him because he was a Confederate turncoat.  Princeton slowly rebuilt during Reconstruction, but the railroad would eventually bring significant growth to Princeton.

Coal and Southern West Virginia
In Southern West Virginia, in the late 19th century, coal mining and transportation by the emerging technology of the railroads combined to form a new industry. Much of the region's bituminous coal was sent northwest to the Great Lakes, or northeast to the Baltimore and Ohio Railroad's coal piers at Baltimore, or to the world's greatest ice-free port of Hampton Roads in eastern Virginia.

The Chesapeake and Ohio Railway's coal piers were located at Newport News. Across the harbor, the Norfolk and Western Railway's coal piers were located on the Elizabeth River in Norfolk. The eastern-bound coal transported by the C&O and the N&W railroads was highly valued for local use and for steam-powered ships, notably those of the U.S. Navy. Loaded into large ships called colliers, the West Virginia "smokeless coal" was sent in coast-wise shipping to the Northeastern U.S. points such as New York City and New England, as well as exported to other countries worldwide.

Princeton's location was east of the primary coalfields, and most of the coal mining and railroad activity was initially elsewhere. However, a combination of factors would soon change that, and have profound financial and developmental impact on Princeton.

William Nelson Page
According to local folklore, in the early 1870s, a young civil engineer named William Nelson Page came to West Virginia to help survey and build Collis P. Huntington's C&O railroad through the valleys of the New River and the Kanawha River to link Virginia with the Ohio River, a line which was completed in 1873 at the new city of Huntington. As his career developed, Page busied himself with many enterprises to develop the natural resources which lay all around him, primarily working with iron and coal operations, often as the manager for wealthy absentee owners. Among these was David T. Ansted, a British geologist who mapped many of the coalfields of southern West Virginia. Dr. Ansted became the namesake for the town of Ansted, where William Nelson Page moved and became his protégé. Of course, with his background with the C&O, Page was also heavily involved in railroads.

Page settled with his family in the Fayette County hamlet of Ansted, located high above the New River Valley along the old James River and Kanawha Turnpike. As president of the Gauley Mountain Coal Company, in 1890, he had company carpenters build a palatial white Victorian mansion on a knoll overlooking the town. Eight servants were employed to care for the family, which included his wife Emma, and their four children.

"Colonel" Page, as he became known, was in truth a uniformed major in a locally recruited Spanish–American War militia. ("Colonel" was an honorific title used informally in the South for many notable men in the years following the American Civil War). A colorful character by all accounts, he was described as a slight man who was known for his handlebar mustache, pince-nez glasses, iron bowler derby, and elegant suits. He was considered to be somewhat aloof by the local population, and could frequently be seen riding a bicycle on the sloping lawn of the mansion. He found time to serve as a mayor of Ansted for ten years, rose to the rank of brigadier inspector general in the West Virginia National Guard, and was also an incorporator and director of Sheltering Arms Hospital in neighboring Kanawha County.

However, William Nelson Page's consuming interest was his work. He was described by former West Virginia governor William A. MacCorkle in his autobiography The Recollections of Fifty Years as a man who knew the geology of the area "as a farmer knows a field."  Page spent long hours working in the den just off the main entrance to his resplendent home. As he studied the areas mapped out by Dr. Ansted as containing coal, he became fascinated with some of the most rugged terrain of southern West Virginia, and the fact that these lands were not yet reached by the major railroads. Years later, author and photographer H. Reid, who wrote The Virginian Railway (Kalmbach, 1961), labeled him the "Idea Man from Ansted."

1902: Deepwater Railway
In 1896, Page developed the Loup Creek and Deepwater Railway, a logging railroad connecting a small sawmill on the old Loup Creek Estate at Robson with the C&O railroad's main line at Deepwater on the Kanawha River. In 1898, it was rechartered as the Deepwater Railway, with modest plans to extend to nearby coal mines at Glen Jean. Around 1903, the new town of Page became the location of one if the earliest stations on the expanding Deepwater Railway, as well as home of the Page Coal and Coke Company.

In 1902, William Page enlisted the support of millionaire industrialist Henry Huttleston Rogers as a silent partner to finance the expansion of the Deepwater Railway much further, about 80 miles through Mullens to reach a N&W railroad branch line at Matoaka to open up new territory with untapped deposits of high volatile bituminous coal. Page, Rogers, and other wealthy investors owned much of this land.

Rogers was a self-made man who had become a principal in John D. Rockefeller's Standard Oil. Even after he was well-off financially, Henry Rogers continued to be what was many years later termed "a workaholic". He was an active developer of all types of natural resources and transportation enterprises. Soon, he had investments of his own in natural gas, copper, steel, coal, and railroad industries. By 1899, he had become one of the richest men in the United States.

Henry Rogers was also an old hand at West Virginia short line railroads.
He had helped build and sell several earlier enterprises which were initially not a great deal different than those proposed by Page.

Overcoming collusion of the big railroads
However, as construction of the expanded Deepwater Railway line got underway, William Page found he was unsuccessful in negotiating fair rates to interchange traffic with either major railroad, nor in interesting them in buying his short line railroad. This was later revealed to be caused by collusion by the leaders of the big railroads, notably Alexander Cassatt, William Kissam Vanderbilt, and Frederick J. Kimball, who sought to control shipping rates and coal prices, and prevent any newcomers from entry. They assumed that any entrepreneurs of modest means, such as William Page appeared to be, would become discouraged and give up. In their experience, building costly enterprises such as railroads customarily meant raising large sums of money through public stock offerings and bonds.

As construction on the Deepwater Railway continued, William Page's continued efforts to establish reasonable joint rates with the big railroads continued to prove fruitless. To the puzzlement of the leaders of the big railroads, who were unaware of Rogers' financial backing, Page (and Rogers) did not give up. Instead, they quietly expanded their plans again to build to the Virginia state line. This expansion brought right-of-way for the planned the Deepwater Railway through Mercer County and Princeton.

1904: Tidewater Railway
In Virginia, Page (and Rogers) formed another intrastate railroad, the new Tidewater Railway, which was legally based in Staunton, a city located along the Chesapeake and Ohio Railway (C&O). Notwithstanding its corporate location on the C&O, agents for the new Tidewater Railway quietly surveyed and secured rights-of-way many miles away from the C&O across southern Virginia, roughly paralleling the Norfolk and Western Railway (N&W). With the help of Rogers' fortune, they were successful, even in the City of Roanoke, where the N&W had its corporate headquarters and major shops.

From Roanoke, the new line ran almost due east, missing major cities and towns, to reach Suffolk. With the help of local leaders in Norfolk, (and more funds from Rogers), a route was obtained set which passed around the City of Norfolk (and the N&W) in a wide, 13-mile long circular path through rural Norfolk County to be headed almost due west again when it reached the site for a new coal pier on the harbor at Hampton Roads at Sewell's Point.

By the time the leaders of the big railroads finally realized that the Deepwater and Tidewater railroads were related, the rights-of-way were secure, and the new competitor could not be blocked. In 1906, N&W president Lucius E. Johnson was brought to the Standard Oil building at 26 Broadway in New York City by Andrew Carnegie to meet with one of Carnegie's old friends: Henry Huttleston Rogers. N&W corporate records only record that the meeting lasted only a few minutes. Thus, the leaders of the big railroads finally learned the source of William Nelson Page's deep pockets. Despite their collusion, there would be new player in their games.

1907: Virginian Railway is born
In 1907, The Deepwater and Tidewater were combined to become the Virginian Railway (VGN). Victoria, a new town created in Lunenburg County, Virginia, became the Division Headquarters east of Roanoke.

Virginian Railway: Division headquarters and Shops
Princeton was designated to be the headquarters of the New River Division, extending from Roanoke westward.

Roundhouses, vital for servicing the new steam locomotives, were established at Sewell's Point, Victoria, Roanoke, and Page. Princeton became
site of the VGN's major shops and yards. Throughout its lifetime, the largest number of Virginian Railway employees were concentrated at Princeton. In the 1930s, the VGN even added the capacity to build railroad cars to the Princeton Shops.

The tiny Class 1 railroad was very profitable and became known as the "Richest Little Railroad in the World." Of course, the VGN's more modern gradient and facilities and profitability were all coveted by the competition. There were many attempts to acquire it. All failed throughout the first half of the 20th century. Finally, as the Interstate Commerce Commission began to realize that railroads needed to be able to compete successfully with trucking and other modes of transportation more than primarily each other, in 1959, the Norfolk and Western succeeded in reaching a merge with the VGN and gaining regulatory approvals, marking what became called the "modern merger era" in North American railroading which eventually resulted in Princeton's current service by Norfolk Southern Railway, one of only 6 large class 1 railroads operating in the United States in the 21st century.

The changes from steam to diesel-electric motive power and the mergers and consolidations resulted in elimination of many shops and jobs, aggravated by a reduction in coal mining activity in West Virginia. Eventually, all but a few of these jobs in Princeton were eliminated by the late 20th century. The N&W (and later NS) maintained coal piers and export facilities at a major facility near downtown Norfolk known as Lambert's Point. After the 1959 merger, the VGN's former coal piers and yards at Sewell's Point were redundant with the Lambert's Point operations. They were eventually shut down, and the land became part of the massive U.S. Naval Station Norfolk, the largest Navy base in the world.

Most of the unused former VGN Princeton Shops facilities were demolished by 2006. The local residents of Princeton were devastated. However, despite the community's loss, a new replica of the VGN's two-story Princeton Passenger Station and Offices had been recently built, the largest such effort in the entire state. A modern structure functionally, while appearing like the original built 100 about years earlier, the new Princeton Station Museum should last for future generations. It hosts a museum to the town's rich railroading heritage and the Virginian Railway.

In the tiny hamlet of Ansted along the Midland Trail, the Page-Vawter House is listed on the National Register of Historic Places. The old Victorian mansion on the knoll overlooking the town as a testament to the area's coal mining heritage and the man who planned the railroad through Princeton: William Nelson Page.

Origin of North and South Walker Streets
According to burned documents:
In 1837, veteran of the War of 1812 Chrispianos H. Walker was chosen by a committee to select a site for a new courthouse for Mercer County. Princeton was selected. North and South Walker Streets are named after him.

2010s
As of 2010, Princeton has an estimated population of 6,432. The city is a secondary hub of the Four Seasons Country area of Southern West Virginia and Southwest Virginia.  Immediately outside of the city limits, a number of hotels, restaurants and shopping areas have developed near the intersection of the West Virginia Turnpike and U.S. Highway 460 in recent years.

The cultural hub The Chuck Mathena Center, which opened in July 2008, contains a 1,000-seat theater and meeting rooms for civic groups and events. Other cultural endeavors include the RiffRaff Arts Collective, the remodeled Princeton Public Library and a Railroad Museum.

The Dr. James W. Hale House, Dr. Robert B. McNutt House, and Mercer County Courthouse are listed on the National Register of Historic Places.  The Mercer Street Historic District and Virginian Railway Yard Historic District are nationally recognized historic districts.

Geography and climate
Princeton is located at  (37.368015, −81.095807).

The average altitude of Princeton is 2400 ft, with highest points at 3100 ft and lowest points at 1700 ft, above sea level.

Demographics

2010 census
As of the census of 2010, there were 6,432 people, 3,030 households, and 1,683 families residing in the city. The racial makeup of the city was 90.7% White, 6.3% African American, 0.3% Native American, 0.8% Asian, 0.2% from other races, and 1.8% from two or more races. Hispanic or Latino of any race were 1.1% of the population.

There were 3,030 households, of which 24.1% had children under the age of 18 living with them, 36.5% were married couples living together, 14.6% had a female householder with no husband present, 4.5% had a male householder with no wife present, and 44.5% were non-families. 38.3% of all households were made up of individuals, and 18.4% had someone living alone who was 65 years of age or older. The average household size was 2.12 and the average family size was 2.79.

The median age in the city was 42.6 years. 19.4% of residents were under the age of 18; 9.2% were between the ages of 18 and 24; 24.4% were from 25 to 44; 26.6% were from 45 to 64; and 20.7% were 65 years of age or older. The gender makeup of the city was 46.5% male and 53.5% female.

2000 census
As of the census of 2000, there were 6,347 people, 2,967 households, and 1,661 families residing in the city. The population density was 2,116.6 people per square mile (816.9/km2). There were 3,371 housing units at an average density of 1,124.2 per square mile (433.9/km2). The racial makeup of the city was 92.03% White, 6.21% African American, 0.30% Native American, 0.43% Asian, 0.02% Pacific Islander, 0.19% from other races, and 0.84% from two or more races. Hispanic or Latino of any race were 0.52% of the population.

There were 2,967 households, out of which 20.0% had children under the age of 18 living with them, 40.8% were married couples living together, 12.0% had a female householder with no husband present, and 44.0% were non-families. 39.6% of all households were made up of individuals, and 21.9% had someone living alone who was 65 years of age or older. The average household size was 2.09 and the average family size was 2.79.

In the city, the population was spread out, with 18.4% under the age of 18, 7.9% from 18 to 24, 24.1% from 25 to 44, 23.8% from 45 to 64, and 25.8% who were 65 years of age or older. The median age was 45 years. For every 100 females, there were 81.2 males. For every 100 females age 18 and over, there were 77.7 males.

The median income for a household in the city was $21,736, and the median income for a family was $32,443. Males had a median income of $25,347 versus $19,750 for females. The per capita income for the city was $14,931. About 16.0% of families and 24.1% of the population were below the poverty line, including 35.9% of those under age 18 and 15.9% of those age 65 or over.

Princeton twin towns
 Yoshkar-Ola (Russia)

Professional sports teams

 Princeton Rays, Appalachian League (Rookie) affiliate of the Tampa Bay Rays. The team played its home games at H. P. Hunnicutt Field. In conjunction with a contraction of Minor League Baseball beginning with the 2021 season, the Appalachian League was reorganized as a collegiate summer baseball league, and the Rays were replaced by a new franchise in the revamped league designed for rising college freshman and sophomores.

References

External links
 
 Princeton, West Virginia

 
Cities in West Virginia
Cities in Mercer County, West Virginia
County seats in West Virginia
Bluefield micropolitan area